The muddy rocksnail, also known as the rugged river snail, scientific name Lithasia salebrosa,  is a species of freshwater snail with a gill and an operculum, an aquatic gastropod mollusk in the family Pleuroceridae. This species is  endemic to the United States.

References 

Molluscs of the United States
Pleuroceridae
Gastropods described in 1834
Taxa named by Timothy Abbott Conrad
Taxonomy articles created by Polbot